Maria Barbara Carillo (Jaén, Spain, 1625 – Madrid, 18 May 1721) was burned at the stake for heresy during the Spanish Inquisition. She was executed at the age of 95 or 96 and is the oldest person known to have been executed at the instigation of the Spanish Inquisition.

Carillo was sentenced to death for heresy for returning to her faith in Judaism. She belonged to a large group of people that were Jews baptized by compulsion, who were accused of secretly practicing the Jewish religion.

See also 
 List of people burned as heretics
 Crypto-Judaism

References

Further reading 
 Google Books
 Publications of the American Jewish Historical Society

1625 births
1721 deaths

18th-century executions by Spain
Conversos
Executed Spanish women
People executed by the Spanish Inquisition
People executed by Spain by burning
People executed for heresy
People from Jaén, Spain
Jewish martyrs
Executed Spanish people
Victims of antisemitic violence